Papilio elephenor, the yellow-crested spangle, is a species of swallowtail butterfly found in Northeast India. Following decades without confirmed sightings, it was rediscovered in 2009 in Assam.

Description
Male upperside dull black. Forewing with an irroration (sprinkling) of brilliant green scales that form cellular and internervular streaks. Hindwing: anterior half to nearly the median vein and above vein 5 irrorated with brilliant blue scales that become gradually sparse towards and cease entirely along the costal margin; posterior half irrorated with brilliant green scales; tornus with a small claret-red patch touched above with a few violet scales and also with an admarginal dusky black spot. Cilia brown alternated with white. Underside black. Forewing with very broad and prominent cellular and internervular pale streaks, the costal margin and the basal half of interspaces 1a and 1 distinctly black. Hindwing: a series of claret-red subterminal lunules, two side by side in each interspace, all more or less irrorated inwardly with violet scales; at the tornal angle these lunules form a conspicuous oblong patch that stretches a short way along the dorsum and bears a subbasal and a subapical black spot. Antennae, the thorax and abdomen narrowly along the middle black; head pinkish red; abdomen on the sides buff coloured.

Female "Agrees with the male. The anal (tornal) red mark on the hindwings above is larger, rounded, marginal, and includes a small black spot, the outer margin (termen) of the hindwing is distinctly sinuate between the median veins (veins 2, 3, 4), and at the, end of the upper median nervule (vein 4) produced into a short but obvious tooth as at the extremity of the lower discoidal vein (vein 5)." (Rothschild quoted in Bingham)

See also
List of butterflies of India
List of butterflies of India (Papilionidae)

References

Further reading
Erich Bauer and Thomas Frankenbach, 1998 Schmetterlinge der Erde, Butterflies of the world Part I (1), Papilionidae Papilionidae I: Papilio, Subgenus Achillides, Bhutanitis, Teinopalpus. Edited by Erich Bauer and Thomas Frankenbach.  Keltern: Goecke & Evers; Canterbury: Hillside Books  
 
 
 
 
 
 

elphenor
Fauna of Pakistan
Butterflies of Asia
Butterflies described in 1845